Point Arena, formerly known as Punta Arena (Spanish for "Sandy Point") is a small coastal city in Mendocino County, California, United States. The population was 460 at the 2020 census, making it one of the smallest incorporated cities in the state.

Its main street is part of State Route 1, California's coastal artery. Along with a number of other Mendocino County coastal communities, Point Arena was associated with the hippie and subsequent counterculture groups. The economy is largely geared toward serving the summertime tourist industry. The city is near the headquarters of the tribal lands of the Manchester Band of Pomo Indians of the Manchester Rancheria and adjacent to the recently formed Point Arena-Stornetta Public Lands National Monument. Hiking trails with coastal prairie and ocean views can be accessed from Point Arena City Hall. At Arena Cove Historic District and pier, huge oceanfront bluffs show the power of the interface of tectonic plates.

History 

The first European to record Point Arena was Spaniard Bartolomé Ferrer in 1543, who named it Cabo de Fortunas ("cape of fortunes"). The cape was renamed to Punta Delgado (narrow point) in 1775 by lieutenant Juan Francisco de la Bodega y Quadra (commander of the schooner Sonora), part of a royal expedition chartered by the government of Mexico to map the north coast of Alta California. Later the point, and the small harbor town south of it, were called Barra de Arena (i.e. sandbar) and finally Punta Arena (literally "sand point").

The Punta Arena post office opened in 1858, and was renamed Point Arena in 1889. The first store at Point Arena opened in 1859. Point Arena incorporated in 1908.

In 1886, Nellie Welch, an 11-year-old girl, was appointed lead operator and had full charge of the telegraph office in Point Arena. Operators like Western Union often hired women because they were cheaper labor than the men.

The Point Arena Cable Station is located in nearby Manchester. Built in 1956 by AT&T Corporation, the cable station serves as the eastern terminus of several undersea cables, including the Japan-US Cable Network and connections to Hawaii and Canada. In 2002, AT&T applied for a permit from the EPA to connect an existing fiber optic conduit to the cable station, since further construction would cause incidental damage to the habitat of the endangered Point Arena mountain beaver.

Geography 
Its ZIP Code is 95468.

This is the location of the Point Arena Light, at  the tallest lighthouse on the west coast of the United States.

Climate
Point Arena has cool, wet winters and mild, relatively dry summers. According to the Köppen climate classification system, it has a cool-summer Mediterranean climate.

There are an average of 83 days with measurable precipitation.

Geology

The 1906 San Francisco earthquake was strongly felt at Point Arena and irreparably damaged the Point Arena Lighthouse, which was then torn down and rebuilt.

Ecology

A variety of fauna and flora occur in the Point Arena area which is a range demarcation for occurrence of some species. For example, the California giant salamander occurs to the south while the Pacific giant salamander occurs to the north.  It is also the type locality for the Point Arena mountain beaver, Aplodontia rufa nigra, which is federally listed under the Endangered Species Act as endangered, and is considered a mammalian species of special concern by the State of California. According to the U.S. Fish and Wildlife Service, the habitat for this subspecies of mountain beaver lies only within a  area around Point Arena. The biggest threat to the PAMB is loss of habitat, and it was officially listed as an endangered species on December 12, 1991. Much local folklore revolves around this mysterious creature.

The Point Arena State Marine Reserve & Point Arena State Marine Conservation Area are two marine protected areas that extend offshore from Point Arena. Sea Lion Cove State Marine Conservation Area and Saunders Reef State Marine Conservation Area lie south of Point Arena. Like underwater parks, these marine protected areas help conserve ocean wildlife and marine ecosystems.

Sound levels in Point Arena are relatively quiet, with many locations at night-time dominated by natural sounds, such as those of the surf. The firm of Earth Metrics Inc., who prepared the Noise Element of the Point Arena General Plan, found that, even considering the presence of logging trucks on main city streets, composite sound levels rarely exceed 55 Leq. The maximum acceptable sound level specified in that General Plan Element is 60 Leq for residential areas.

Demographics

2010
At the 2010 census Point Arena had a population of 449. The racial makeup of Point Arena was 305 (67.9%) White, 2 (0.4%) African American, 1 (0.2%) Native American, 0 (0.0%) Asian, 0 (0.0%) Pacific Islander, 118 (26.3%) from other races, and 23 (5.1%) from two or more races. Hispanic or Latino of any race were 150 people (33.4%).

The whole population lived in households, no one lived in non-institutionalized group quarters and no one was institutionalized.

There were 192 households, 57 (29.7%) had children under the age of 18 living in them, 62 (32.3%) were opposite-sex married couples living together, 25 (13.0%) had a female householder with no husband present, 13 (6.8%) had a male householder with no wife present.  There were 20 (10.4%) unmarried opposite-sex partnerships, and 3 (1.6%) same-sex married couples or partnerships. 71 households (37.0%) were one person and 28 (14.6%) had someone living alone who was 65 or older. The average household size was 2.34.  There were 100 families (52.1% of households); the average family size was 3.08.

The age distribution was 112 people (24.9%) under the age of 18, 31 people (6.9%) aged 18 to 24, 116 people (25.8%) aged 25 to 44, 132 people (29.4%) aged 45 to 64, and 58 people (12.9%) who were 65 or older.  The median age was 40.0 years. For every 100 females, there were 109.8 males.  For every 100 females age 18 and over, there were 103.0 males.

There were 225 housing units at an average density of 166.7 per square mile, of the occupied units 87 (45.3%) were owner-occupied and 105 (54.7%) were rented. The homeowner vacancy rate was 4.4%; the rental vacancy rate was 8.7%.  189 people (42.1% of the population) lived in owner-occupied housing units and 260 people (57.9%) lived in rental housing units.

2000
At the 2000 census there were 474 people in 191 households, including 109 families, in the city. The racial makeup of the city was 73.63% White, 1.05% African American, 3.80% Native American, 0.21% Asian, 18.78% from other races, and 2.53% from two or more races. Hispanic or Latino of any race were 28.48%.

Of the 191 households 33.0% had children under the age of 18 living with them, 39.3% were married couples living together, 13.6% had a female householder with no husband present, and 42.9% were non-families. 32.5% of households were one person and 8.4% were one person aged 65 or older.  The average household size was 2.48 and the average family size was 3.30.

The age distribution was 32.9% under the age of 18, 7.2% from 18 to 24, 27.8% from 25 to 44, 23.0% from 45 to 64, and 9.1% 65 or older.  The median age was 33 years. For every 100 females, there were 110.7 males.  For every 100 females age 18 and over, there were 106.5 males.

The median income for a household in the city was $27,083, and the median family income  was $32,885. Males had a median income of $21,042 versus $15,000 for females. The per capita income for the city was $12,591.  About 24.1% of families and 26.0% of the population were below the poverty line, including 36.0% of those under age 18 and 4.5% of those age 65 or over.

Education
The city has three high schools: Point Arena High School, South Coast Continuation High School, and the Pacific Community Charter High School. Students are allowed to cross-enroll and take courses at both the Point Arena High and Charter High schools, granting Point Arena students access to a broad curriculum from which to choose, although, due to limited teaching staff, many of the top students are left without options. The choice of the charter school has helped to keep in Point Arena many students who formerly commuted to Mendocino to attend its high school. Several feeder schools bring students through grammar school before sending them to Point Arena High School or the Charter School, meaning that the schools draw from a large pool of students in southern Mendocino and northern Sonoma counties.

Government
Point Arena is governed by an elected five-member city council which includes the mayor.

See also
Point Arena Hot Springs

References

External links

 

Incorporated cities and towns in California
Populated coastal places in California
Cities in Mendocino County, California